Lucas Rastello (born 21 April 1985) is a French former professional footballer who played as a goalkeeper. He started his career with Marseille, where he made five appearances for the reserve team, before joining Cagnes-sur-Mer in 2005. Two years later, Rastello signed for Marignane and went on to play 88 league matches over the following three seasons. He transferred to Gazélec Ajaccio in the summer of 2010 and made 14 league appearances in the next two seasons as the side won consecutive promotions, firstly to the Championnat National in 2011 and then to Ligue 2 the following year. Rastello made his professional debut in the 1–2 Coupe de la Ligue defeat to Arles-Avignon on 28 August 2012.

References
Lucas Rastello career statistics at foot-national.com

1985 births
Living people
Footballers from Marseille
French footballers
Association football goalkeepers
Olympique de Marseille players
Marignane Gignac Côte Bleue FC players
Gazélec Ajaccio players
Ligue 2 players
Championnat National players